Tanya Grotter is the protagonist of a Russian fantasy novel series by Dmitri Yemets. Tanya (short for Tatiana) Grotter is an orphan with intentional resemblances to J. K. Rowling's Harry Potter. Despite its reputation in Russia and the many books it has spawned, the series is not available in English translation, because of the first book having been judged a breach of copyright.

Content
The central character and plot elements of the first novel, Tanya Grotter and the Magical Double Bass, are a humorous parody of Harry Potter and the Philosopher's Stone, but are transposed into a Russian setting. Tanya Grotter has an unusual birthmark on her nose, magical powers, an upbringing by "Lopukhoid" (equivalent to Muggle) relatives after her parents were killed by an evil sorceress Chuma-del-Tort (the official translation of Voldemort's name in Russian was 'Volan-de-Mort'), and goes to study at the Tibidokhs (Тибидохс) School for Behaviorally-Challenged Young Witches and Wizards. Tanya's foster-family, the Durnevs, live in an urban apartment block, and Tanya is forced to sleep not in a cupboard but in the apartment's loggia.

Yemets described the books as "a cultural reply" to the Potter series, and they feature allusion to Russian culture and folklore such as Baba Yaga, rusalki, witches on Bald Mountain and the works of Pushkin (for instance, Tibidox is on the island of Buyan mentioned in Pushkin's The Tale of Tsar Saltan).

After the first book, the plots diverge from those of the Harry Potter series. For instance, in Tanya Grotter and the Golden Leech, Tanya finds herself pitted against "Hurry Pooper" (a thinly disguised Harry Potter) in the World Dragonball Championship. While trying to reach the ball, they crash, creating a new timeline in which Chuma-del-Tort has won, good and evil being reversed, and all the characters are speaking a Russian equivalent of Orwellian Newspeak. To restore normality, Tanya must defeat the Golden Leech.

Legal history

While the series is legally published in Russia, it is not available in translation due to a lawsuit on behalf of J. K. Rowling and Time Warner. Having failed to obtain a cease and desist order in Russia, Rowling and Time Warner targeted publication in the Netherlands, where first translations of international editions are commonly published. In 2003, courts there prevented the distribution of a Dutch translation of the first in the series, Tanya Grotter and the Magical Double Bass, after Rowling and Time Warner's lawyers issued a cease and desist order, arguing that the Grotter books violated copyright law, specifically infringing on Rowling's right to control derivative works. Yemets and his Moscow-based publishers, Eksmo, argued unsuccessfully that the book constituted a parody, permitted under copyright.

Later that year, as the Dutch translation Tanja Grotter en de magische contrabas was still legal in Belgium, the Flemish publishers Roularta Books decided to print 1,000 copies (and no more) in order to let people decide whether it was plagiarism, hoping that under those circumstances Rowling and her publishers would not sue. Rowling did not sue, but as there was a lot of interest in the book (Dutch people could buy the book by postal order from another Flemish publisher, Boekhandel VanIn), it was soon sold out.

Subsequent history
In 2003, after the first five books, the total circulation of Tanya Grotter books reached a million. As of 2006 the figure, including spinoffs, was approaching 3 million. In a 2006 interview, Yemets said that he had moved on to "urban absurd comic genre fantasy" with the Buslaev series, but that there was still reader demand, and sufficient material, for an 11th Tanya book. He described the Tanya Grotter series as a purely Russian phenomenon, dependent on the language and culture, and commented that he would not place much faith in Tanya living a full life if she were brought to the playing field of Europe or America.

In 2006, Yemets' books featured in the 10 best children's books 2006 in a reader's poll at the Pushkin Central Children's Library, Saint Petersburg. In July 2006, his Tanya Grotter and the Pearl Ring was the highest-selling children's book in Russia (his Methodius Buslaev: Vengeance of the Valkyries was #10, while JK Rowling's Harry Potter and the Half-Blood Prince and Harry Potter and the Order of the Phoenix ranked #2 and #6.

Titles
From the Tanya Grotter official site:

Tanya Grotter and the Magical Double Bass (Таня Гроттер и магический контрабас)
Tanya Grotter and the Disappearing Floor (Таня Гроттер и исчезающий этаж)
Tanya Grotter and the Golden Leech (Таня Гроттер и Золотая Пиявка)
Tanya Grotter and the Throne of Drevnir (Таня Гроттер и трон Древнира)
Tanya Grotter and the Pikestaff of the Magi (Таня Гроттер и посох волхвов)
Tanya Grotter and the Hammer of Perun (Таня Гроттер и молот Перуна)
Tanya Grotter and the Pince-nez of Noah (Таня Гроттер и пенсне Ноя)
Tanya Grotter and the Boots of the Centaur (Таня Гроттер и ботинки кентавра)
Tanya Grotter and the Well of Poseidon (Таня Гроттер и колодец Посейдона)
Tanya Grotter and the Curl of Aphrodite (Таня Гроттер и локон Афродиты)
Tanya Grotter and the Pearl Ring (Таня Гроттер и перстень с жемчужиной)
Tanya Grotter and the Curse of the Necromage (Таня Гроттер и проклятье некромага)
Tanya Grotter and the Garrulous Sphinx (Таня Гроттер и болтливый сфинкс)
Tanya Grotter and the bird of Titans (Таня Гроттер и птица титанов)

Spinoff titles:

Tanya Grotter and the Complete Tibidox! Phrases, Quotations and Aphorisms (Таня Гроттер и полный Тибидохс! Фразочки, цитатки и афоризмы)
Worlds of Tanya Grotter (Миры Тани Гроттер) - a compilation of fan-written graphic novels

There are several other spin-offs from the Tanya Grotter series. The Methodius Buslaev (Мефодий Буслаев) series, featuring a young male magician, and the Hooligan fantasy (Хулиганское фэнтези) series:

Methodius Buslaev. Magician of Midnight (Мефодий Буслаев. Маг полуночи)
Methodius Buslaev. Roll of Desire (Мефодий Буслаев. Свиток желаний)
Methodius Buslaev. Third Rider of the Gloom (Мефодий Буслаев. Третий всадник мрака)
Methodius Buslaev. Ticket to the Bald Mountain (Мефодий Буслаев. Билет на лысую гору)
Methodius Buslaev. Vengeance of the Valkyries (Мефодий Буслаев. Месть валькирий)
Methodius Buslaev. Depressnyak's Secret Magic (Мефодий Буслаев. Тайная магия Депресcняка)
Methodius Buslaev. Tartarus's Ice and Flame (Мефодий Буслаев. Лед и пламя Тартара)
Methodius Buslaev. The First Eydos (Мефодий Буслаев. Первый Эйдос)
Methodius Buslaev. Wings of Light for the Dark Guard (Мефодий Буслаев. Светлые крылья для тёмного стража)
Methodius Buslaev. Stairway to Eden (Мефодий Буслаев. Лестница в Эдем)
Methodius Buslaev. The map of Chaos (Мефодий Буслаев. Карта Хаоса)
Methodius Buslaev. Dryad's necklace (Мефодий Буслаев. Ожерелье дриады)
Methodius Buslaev. Glass guard (Мефодий Буслаев. Стеклянный страж)

Hooligan fantasy: Great Something (Хулиганское фэнтези: Великое нечто)

Computer gaming company Akella was supposed to release a game based on the first Tanya Grotter book on March 26, 2008. A second game has been released based on the second book.

An English version of Tanya Grotter's first four books in a translation by Jane H. Buckingham is available on Emets' website.

Similarities 
The Dutch court found the following similarities between Harry Potter and Tanya Grotter:

References

External links
 
Russian Wikipedia (TG character)  
Harry Potter and the International Order of Copyright, Should Tanya Grotter and the Magic Double Bass be banned?, Tim Wu, Slate.com, June 27, 2003

Books about women
Contemporary fantasy novels
Fantasy books by series
Novels about orphans
Novels involved in plagiarism controversies
Russian fantasy novels
Series of children's books
Unofficial adaptations
Witchcraft in written fiction
Works based on Harry Potter